Dhufi is a village in the Kutch District of the Indian state of Gujarat. The Pin code is: 370660.

Dhufi is divided into two parts, which are Nani (small) Dhufi and Moti (big) Dhufi. Nani Dhufi is on Naliya Road.

References

 

Villages in Kutch district